Petauroidea is a superfamily of marsupials from Australia and New Guinea. It is part of the suborder Phalangeriformes within the order Diprotodontia, which also includes, among others, wombats, kangaroos, cuscuses. The superfamily Phalangeroidea, including cuscuses and brushtail possums (family Phalangeridae) and pygmy possums (family Burramyidae), is the immediate sister group of the Petauroidea.

Species

The superfamily includes the following recent species:

Superfamily Petauroidea
 Family Pseudocheiridae
 Subfamily Hemibelideinae
 Genus Hemibelideus
 Lemur-like ringtail possum, Hemibelideus lemuroides
 Genus Petauroides
 Central greater glider, Petauroides armillatus
 Northern greater glider, Petauroides minor
 Southern greater glider, Petauroides volans
 Subfamily Pseudocheirinae
 Genus Petropseudes
 Rock-haunting ringtail possum, Petropseudes dahli
 Genus Pseudocheirus
 Common ringtail possum, Pseudocheirus peregrinus
 Genus Pseudochirulus
 Lowland ringtail possum, Pseudochirulus canescens
 Weyland ringtail possum, Pseudochirulus caroli
 Cinereus ringtail possum, Pseudochirulus cinereus
 Painted ringtail possum, Pseudochirulus forbesi
 Herbert River ringtail possum, Pseudochirulus herbertensis
 Masked ringtail possum, Pseudochirulus larvatus
 Pygmy ringtail possum, Pseudochirulus mayeri
 Vogelkop ringtail possum, Pseudochirulus schlegeli
 Subfamily Pseudochiropsinae
 Genus Pseudochirops
 D'Albertis' ringtail possum, Pseudochirops albertisii
 Green ringtail possum, Pseudochirops archeri
 Plush-coated ringtail possum, Pseudochirops corinnae
 Reclusive ringtail possum, Pseudochirops coronatus
 Coppery ringtail possum, Pseudochirops cupreus
 Family Petauridae
 Genus Dactylopsila
 Great-tailed triok, Dactylopsila megalura
 Long-fingered triok, Dactylopsila palpator
 Tate's triok, Dactylopsila tatei
 Striped possum, Dactylopsila trivirgata
 Genus Gymnobelideus
 Leadbeater's possum, Gymnobelideus leadbeateri
 Genus Petaurus
 Northern glider, Petaurus abidi
 Savanna glider, Petaurus ariel
 Yellow-bellied glider, Petaurus australis
 Biak glider, Petaurus biacensis
 Sugar glider, Petaurus breviceps
 Mahogany glider, Petaurus gracilis
 Squirrel glider, Petaurus norfolcensis
 Krefft's glider, Petaurus notatus
 Family Tarsipedidae
 Genus Tarsipes
 Honey possum or Noolbenger, Tarsipes rostratus
 Family Acrobatidae
 Genus Acrobates
 Feathertail glider, Acrobates pygmaeus
 Genus Distoechurus
 Feather-tailed possum, Distoechurus pennatus

Literature
Groves, C.P. 2005. Order Diprotodontia. pp. 43–70 in Wilson, D.E. & Reeder, D.M. (eds.). Mammal Species of the World: a taxonomic and geographic reference. 3rd ed. Baltimore: The Johns Hopkins University Press, 2 vols., 2142 pp. 

Possums
Mammal superfamilies
Taxa named by Charles Lucien Bonaparte